Xavier Le Pichon (born 18 June 1937 in Qui Nhơn, French protectorate of Annam (after South Vietnam and today Vietnam) is a French geophysicist. Among many other contributions, he is known for his comprehensive model of plate tectonics (1968), helping create the field of plate tectonics. In 1968 he combined the kinematic ideas of W.J. Morgan, D. McKenzie and R.L. Parker with the large data sets collected by Lamont, and especially with the respective magnetic profiles, to show that Plate Tectonics could accurately describe the evolution of the major ocean basins.  He is professor at the Collège de France, holder of the Chair of Geodynamics (1986–2008).  He is a lifelong devout Catholic, and has come to think of caring attention to others' weakness as an essential quality that allowed humanity to evolve. He lives with his wife and has five children and eleven grandchildren.

Biography
Le Pichon holds a doctorate in physics. Professional career:
 1963: He began his scientific career as a scientific assistant at Columbia University, New York, United States.
 In 1969, he became head of the marine geology department of the oceanologic center of Brittany in Brest, France.
 In 1978, he became professor at Université P. et M. Curie (University of Paris VI).
 In 1984, he was head of the geology department at the École Normale Supérieure.
 In 1986, he became a professor at the Collège de France.

Prizes and memberships of learned societies
 In 1973, he won the CNRS Silver Medal.
 1984: Maurice Ewing Medal from the American Geophysical Union
 1985: member of the French Academy of Sciences; made knight of the Legion of Honour
 1990: Japan Prize; made officer of the National Order of Merit
 1991: Wollaston Medal, Geological Society of London
 1995: foreign associate of the United States National Academy of Sciences
 2002: Balzan Prize

Works

References

Further reading

External links
 home page at Collège de France
  Interview with Le Pichon, "Fragility and the Evolution of Our Humanity" – Speaking of Faith (25 June 2009)
  Xavier Le Pichon International Balzan Prize Foundation

Foreign associates of the National Academy of Sciences
Living people
French geophysicists
Members of the French Academy of Sciences
Wollaston Medal winners
1937 births
People from Bình Định province
Academic staff of the Collège de France
Academic staff of the École Normale Supérieure
Columbia University faculty
French Roman Catholics
Marine geophysicists